The 1908 Kansas gubernatorial election was held on November 3, 1908. The Republican nominee Walter R. Stubbs defeated the Democratic nominee Jeremiah D. Botkin, with 52.49% of the vote.

General election

Candidates
Major party candidates 
Walter R. Stubbs, Republican
Jeremiah D. Botkin, Democratic

Other candidates
George F. Hibner, Socialist
Alfred L. Hope, Prohibition 
John W. Northrop, Independent

Results

References

1908
Kansas
Gubernatorial